The U. J. Esuene Stadium is a multi-purpose stadium in Calabar, Nigeria. It is used mostly for football matches and is the home stadium of Calabar Rovers and previously Dolphins F.C.  The stadium has a capacity of 16,000 and was opened in 1977.

History
The UJ Esuene Stadium was inaugurated on the 2 April 1977 with a match between Benin's Bendel Insurance F.C. and newly formed Calabar Rovers of Calabar. Two weeks later, the stadium hosted an international encounter between Enugu Rangers and Tonnerre Yaoundé - a game that featured the likes of Roger Milla, Christian Chukwu and Emmanuel Okala.

Games at the 2003 All-Africa Games were also played at the U. J. Esuene Stadium in October 2003, as were Nigeria's qualifiers for the 2008 Africa Cup of Nations. It was also short-listed as a stadium for the 2009 FIFA U-17 World Cup.

The stadium has been further upgraded to include an ultra modern electronic video-matrix scoreboard, with impressive floodlights.

Notable football matches hosted

1999 FIFA World Youth Championship

2009 FIFA U-17 World Cup

References

Football venues in Nigeria
Multi-purpose stadiums in Nigeria
Sports venues completed in 1977
Calabar Rovers F.C.
20th-century architecture in Nigeria